The No. 6 Dance is the third album by blues band Five Horse Johnson. The song "Mississippi King" is featured in the soundtracks of Tony Hawk's Underground and Monster Jam: Urban Assault. "It Ain't Easy" is a cover of the Ron Davies song. "Intro" contains dialogue from the movie Apocalypse Now.

Track listing 
All tracks written by Mike Alonso, Brad Coffin, Eric Oblander, and Steve Smith, unless otherwise noted.

"Intro" - 0:19
"Mississippi King" - 3:34 (Five Horse Johnson, Jimmy Bones, Kenny Olson)
"Spillin' Fire" - 3:10
"Silver" - 4:42
"Gods of Demolition" - 3:59
"Shine Around" - 4:16 (Five Horse Johnson, Jimmy Bones, Kenny Olson)
"It Ain't Easy" - 4:17 (Ron Davies)
"Hollerin'" - 4:07
"Lollipop" - 4:29
"Swallow the World" - 4:44
"Buzzard Luck" - 3:41
"Odella" - 14:24
"(Mystery)" - 0:57

Track 13 is a hidden track.

References

External links
Five Horse Johnson official website

2000 albums
Five Horse Johnson albums